Garići is a settlement in the Bosnia and Herzegovina, Republika Srpska entity, Kotor Varoš Municipality. In the census year of 1991, in this village lived 1,341, and 2013: 737.

Population

References

External links
 Mape, aerodromi i vremenska situacija lokacija (-{Fallingrain}-)
 Gugl satelitska mapa (-{Maplandia}-)

Villages in Republika Srpska
Kotor Varoš